Fakta Ladh Mhana is a 2011 Indian Marathi-language revenge Action-thriller film directed by Sanjay Jadhav. It is produced and written by Mahesh Manjrekar. The film is lead by Aniket Vishwasrao, Siddharth Jadhav, Sanjay Narvekar, Santosh Juvekar, Bharat Jadhav, Mahesh Manjrekar, Sachin Khedekar and Vaibhav Mangle. It is notable for being one of the costliest Marathi film.

Plot
The story revolves around a gang that consists of Tukaram, Westindies (a dark guy), Kanphatya (who has hearing problems), Salim, Alex (an aggressive guy), Paani Cum ( a small boy) and Baba Bhai (leader of the gang). The story of film is about the suicides of the farmers.

They threaten Kulkarni and take him to the police custody. But because of Madhusudhan Patil's power Kulkarni is saved and the five boys are arrested. They are ordered by Bababhai to come back to Mumbai. While going they discover that Bhaskarrao had killed Panikum. Alex is very angry and they decide to stay back and avenge his death. They threaten Madhusudhan Patil, Bhaskarrao and Kulkarni that they will kill them in 12 days. They hide at Madhusudhan Patil's farmhouse. They capture Kulkarni and get the evidence of Madhusudhan Patil's illegal work. They also kill Lokesh Dharne, a journalist who was responsible for the death of Milind Master. Madhusudhan Patil calls his goons to kill the five boys. One night Madhusudhan Patil realizes that the five boys are hiding in his farmhouse. They fight with them there and in the fight Salim and Kanfatya die. Afterwards West Indies, Tukaram and Alex kill Bhaskarrao. Somehow Madhusudhan Patil manages to kill them with the help of Bababhai but as he cremates them, they come out of their pyres and attack Madhusudhan Patil and his men.  In the end Madhusudhan Patil is burnt to death by the boys and Bababhai and they proudly walk away.
.

Cast
 Sachin Khedekar as Madhusudan Patil
 Bharat Jadhav as Tukaram
 Sanjay Narvekar as Kanfatya
 Siddhartha Jadhav as West Indies
 Manva Naik as girlfriend of West Indies
 Vaibhav Mangle as Sawkar Kulkarni
 Aniket Vishwasrao as Alex
 Mahesh Manjrekar as Bababhai
 Kranti Redkar as Tukaram's girlfriend
 Santosh Juvekar as Salim
 Sanjay Khapre as Bhaskarrao Patil
 Umesh Tonpe as Sam
 Satish Pulekar as Gangadhar
 Amruta Khanvilkar as Special Appearance in song
 Manasi Naik as Special Appearance in song

Production and promotion
The film's promotion caught audiences as it aroused curiosity through poster. The poster only showed five men holding another person at gunpoint. The actors were not seen in this poster. The film also caught many eyes for being one of the most costliest Marathi film. The budge of the film went above 4 crore.

Soundtrack
The music of Fakta Ladh Mhana is composed by the duo of Ajit-Sameer while the lyrics are penned by Guru Thakur, Kaushal Inamdar, Pravin Kunvar & Jeetendra Joshi.

References

External links
 

2011 films
2000s Marathi-language films
Films directed by Sanjay Jadhav